Moto Z2 Play is a mid-range Android smartphone developed by Motorola Mobility, as the successor to 2016's Moto Z Play. As with other smartphones in the Moto Z series, it supports Motorola's magnetically attachable "MotoMods" modules.

Specifications

Hardware 
The Z2 Play features a Qualcomm Snapdragon 626 system-on-chip, backed by 3 or 4GB of RAM. It comes with either 32 or 64GB storage, with microSD expansion. The phone does not have much design changes from its predecessor, to be able to have successful compatibility with previous Moto Mods, as Motorola promised. Some notable changes include a metal backplate, instead of the glass back used previously, a slight reduction in thickness (−1mm), and change of the shape of the home button from square to oval to enhance your experience with the device, with the built-in “Moto” app, which can enable “one button navigation”. The handset comes with a 1080p AMOLED display. It does not have an IP (International Protection) dust and water resistance rating, but does have a 3.5mm headphone jack and an internal FM radio. The camera department has been improved as well, sporting a 12MP sensor with 1.7 aperture, but lacks OIS.

Software 
It comes with Android 7.1.1 “Nougat”, with a few software tweaks. It is possible to upgrade the phone to Android 8.0.0 “Oreo” or Android 9.0 “Pie” with an update.

Reception 
CNET noted its strong battery life, clever software and magnetic Moto Mod add-ons as the Motorola Z2 Play's main strengths, while also saying that it felt uncomfortable without a cover and complained about poorer battery life as compared to its predecessor.

Pocket-lint praised its battery life, fingerprint sensor's gesture controls and the processor's smoothness, but they also felt that the OnePlus 5 gives a better run for money and that not all MotoMods fit perfectly.

Further reading 
Android Authority Review

References 

Android (operating system) devices
Motorola mobile phones
Mobile phones introduced in 2017